Chicken inasal, commonly known simply as inasal, is a variant of the Filipino chicken dish known as lechon manok. It is chicken marinated in a mixture of calamansi, pepper, coconut vinegar and annatto, then grilled over hot coals while basted with the marinade. It is served with rice, calamansi, soy sauce, chicken oil and vinegar (often sinamak vinegar, a palm vinegar infused with garlic, chili peppers and langkawas). A common dish in the Visayas, it is a popular specialty in the city of Bacolod, where an entire street market is dedicated to local dishes, particularly inasal. A sign in the heart of the market reads "Manokan Country" (literally "Chicken Country" in Hiligaynon). Many restaurant chains are famous for serving inasal, like Bacolod Chicken Inasal and Mang Inasal, which originated in Iloilo City.

The origin of inasal's popularity can be traced back to Bacolod's Cuadra Street (Chicken Alley) in the 1970s. However, there are also several accounts implicating the existence of inasal in Iloilo's Fort San Pedro area during the Spanish colonial period. Nonetheless, the tastes of inasal in the two cities are different. Many people believe that Bacolod's inasal has a slightly sour base flavor, while Iloilo's has a sweet flavor; hence, the taste of inasal in the restaurant chain Mang Inasal.

On November 16, 2022, chicken inasal was declared an important cultural property of Bacolod.

See also
 Inihaw
 List of chicken dishes
 List of spit-roasted foods

References

Philippine chicken dishes
Barbecue
Spit-cooked foods
Culture of Negros Occidental
Visayan cuisine